Artur Alekseyevich Muravyov (born on 5 February 1965), is a Russian statesman and politician, who is currently the 5th Plenipotentiary Representative of the president of Russia in the Federation Council since 29 October 2013.

Biography

Artur Muravyov was born on 5 February 1965.

From 1993 to 1996, Muravyov had been a member of parliament, a deputy of the State Duma.

From 1998 to 1999, he was the first First Deputy Chairman of the State Committee for Reserves of Russia. From 2001 to 2002, he was the Deputy Head of the Directorate of the Main Directorate of Internal Policy of the President of Russia. From 2002 to 2012, he was the Deputy Head of the State Legal Directorate of the President of Russia. From 2012 too 2013, he was the Deputy Head of the Office of the President of Russia for Work with Appeals from Citizens and Organizations.

On 29 October 2013, Maravyov became the 5th Plenipotentiary Representative in the Federation Council.

Family

He is married and has a daughter.

References

1965 births
Living people
1st class Active State Councillors of the Russian Federation
People from Klin
First convocation members of the State Duma (Russian Federation)